Herbert Allen Gorman (December 19, 1924 – April 5, 1953) was an American professional baseball player. He had only one Major League at bat in a single game played for the St. Louis Cardinals in 1952; then, the following season, he died at age 28 after he was stricken with a fatal heart attack while he was playing a minor league game.

Career
Born in San Francisco to Jewish parents, and Jewish himself, Gorman threw and batted left-handed. His minor league career spanned eleven seasons, from  until , with 1944–45 missed during Gorman's military service in the United States Coast Guard during World War II. 

In Gorman's one MLB at bat, on April 19, 1952 at Wrigley Field, he pinch hit for Cardinals' pitcher Willard Schmidt and grounded out to second base against Cubs' starter Turk Lown. He spent the remainder of 1952 with the San Diego Padres of the top-level Pacific Coast League, batting .261 in 108 games.

After returning to the Padres in 1953, he was playing left field on April 5 in a home game against the Hollywood Stars, his former PCL team. According to accounts of the game, he had hit two doubles but left the contest when he complained of chest pain during the sixth inning. He died en route to a local hospital from a massive heart attack.

Lefty O'Doul, his manager in San Diego, commented that Gorman "never complained, never caused trouble – he just wanted to play. I wanted to see how some rookies would do, so that's why he was making his first start. But I quickly saw that Gorman should play. A quiet fellow who just minded his own business. It's a terrible loss for his family and our team."

He was interred at Oak Hill Memorial Park in San Jose.

References

External links

Baseball Almanac page

1924 births
1953 deaths
20th-century American Jews
Baseball players from California
Hollywood Stars players
Jewish American baseball players
Jewish American military personnel
Jewish Major League Baseball players
Johnstown Johnnies players
Montreal Royals players
Pueblo Dodgers players
St. Louis Cardinals players
San Diego Padres (minor league) players
Spokane Indians players
Sports deaths in California
Trois-Rivières Royals players
United States Coast Guard personnel of World War II